The 2016–17 figure skating season began on July 1, 2016, and ended on June 30, 2017. Elite skaters began the season competing on the Grand Prix series or Junior Grand Prix series, culminating in the Grand Prix Final, and the ISU Challenger Series. Following national championships, competitors will appear at ISU Championships, such as the 2017 European, Four Continents, World Junior, and World Championships.

Age eligibility 
Skaters are eligible to compete in ISU events at the senior, junior, or novice levels according to their age:

Changes 

If skaters of different nationalities team up, the ISU requires that they choose one country to represent.

Date refers to date when the change occurred or, if not available, the date when the change was announced.

Partnership changes

Retirements

Coaching changes

Competitions 

Scheduled international competitions:

Key

International medalists

Men

Ladies

Pairs

Ice dance

Season's best scores

Men

Best total score

Best short program score

Best free skating score

Ladies

Best total score

Best short program score

Best free skating score

Pairs

Best total score

Best short program score

Best free skating score

Ice dance

Best total score

Best short dance score

Best free dance score

Standings and ranking

Season-end standings (top 30)

Men's singles

Ladies' singles

Pairs

Ice dance

Season's ranking (top 30)

Men's singles

Ladies' singles

Pairs

Ice dance

References

External links 
 International Skating Union

Seasons in figure skating